Intervac International (short for International Vacation) is a service used to arrange home exchanges.

Founded in 1953 in Switzerland by several teachers that wanted to travel internationally with a limited budget during their summer vacations, Intervac was the first home exchange network.

References

Organizations established in 1953
Vacation rental
Cultural exchange
Hospitality companies of Sweden
Hospitality services